1340 kHz is defined as a Class C (local) frequency in the coterminous United States and such stations on this frequency are limited to 1,000 watts. U.S. stations outside the coterminous United States (Alaska, Hawaii, Puerto Rico, & the U.S. Virgin Islands) on this frequency are defined as Class B (regional) stations.

The following radio stations broadcast on AM frequency 1340 kHz:

Bermuda
ZBM

Canada

Cuba
 Radio GTMO transmits news and talk radio programs to American military personnel and their families at Guantanamo Bay Naval Base.

Mexico
 XEAA-AM in Mexicali, Baja California
 XEAPM-AM in Apatzingán, Michoacan
 XEBK-AM in Nuevo Laredo, Tamaulipas
 XECR-AM in Morelia, Michoacan
 XECSAC-AM in San Luis Potosi, San Luis Potosi
 XEDH-AM in Cd. Acuña, Coahuila
 XEDKT-AM in Guadalajara, Jalisco
 XENV-AM in Monterrey, Nuevo León

United States

References

Lists of radio stations by frequency